Haplidus laticeps is a species of beetle in the family Cerambycidae. It was described by Knull in 1941.

References

Hesperophanini
Beetles described in 1941